"This Time" is a song by British singer-songwriter Melanie C. It was released as the fourth and final international single from the album, This Time, released in the United Kingdom the same week the Spice Girls re-united for the world tour in Los Angeles, California.

Written by Adam Argyle, the single was released on 12 October 2007 in Germany, Switzerland and Austria and on October 22, 2007 in UK. Melanie re-recorded this track for a new single version. The single features a B-side track called "We Love to Entertain You" which was used for 2007's Pro7 Starforce campaign in Germany. A video with Melanie performing "We Love to Entertain You" was shown on the Pro7 trailers in 2008. "This Time" has sold over 100,000 copies worldwide.

Music video
The original video shoot for the song was cancelled in August 2007, due to the death of video director Tim Royes. Melanie filmed the video in September 2007 with Tim's friend & director Adrian Moat, as a tribute to the late video director.

The video started with Melanie sitting on a chair with a spotlight directed to her. As she started singing the chorus of the song "This Time", she stood up and followed the light that was directed to her. In the second verse, Melanie was seen lying on the floor and she stood up once again to follow the light. As the bridge of the song kicked in, Melanie turned her back on the light and started running. At the end of the music video, the light faded away as Melanie got close to the light.

The music video was premiered on September 21, 2007 on Melanie C's official website. In the first day of its release, music video become "The Most Viewed: Music Video" on YouTube chart.

Chart performance
In Germany, the single debuted at a low #71 and rose to #69 in its second week on the chart, making it the lowest charting single from her time on Red Girl Records. The single entered and charted on the UK Singles Chart at #94 for one week only. In the United Kingdom, it became the lowest charting single of her solo career at the time.

We Love To Entertain You - B-Side
The single features a B-side track called "We Love to Entertain You", which was a reworked version of We Love, the theme song used for 2007's Pro7 Starforce campaign in Germany. In the summer of 2010, there was an online competition for fans to submit a video for the song, and the winner would get their video uploaded onto Melanie C's YouTube channel. The winner was Joana Valentina, and another video was uploaded featuring all the contest entries and a cameo from Chisholm herself at the end.

Formats and track listings
These are the formats and track listings of major single releases of "This Time":

UK Maxi single 
 "This Time"  - 3:30
 "Understand"  - 3:52
 "We Love to Entertain You" - 3:34
 "This Time"  - 3:32

UK 7-inch single
 "This Time"  - 3:30
 "Understand"  - 3:52

European Maxi single 
 "This Time"  - 3:30
 "We Love to Entertain You" - 3:34
 "Understand"  - 3:52
 "This Time"  - 3:27

Switzerland 2-track CD single 
 "This Time"  - 3:30
 "We Love to Entertain You" - 3:34

 Due to an error at the mastering studio, all releases contained the original version of "Understand", despite them being labelled as containing the Alternate Version. To rectify this error, Melanie C's official website gave the correct track away as a free download.

Live performances
Melanie C performed the song on the following events:
 This Time Canadian Tour
 Live at the Hard Rock Cafe

Release history

Charts

References

External links
 Official site

2007 singles
Melanie C songs
Pop ballads
Songs written by Adam Argyle
2006 songs
Song recordings produced by Peter-John Vettese